Catherine "Cathryn" Credo Masanja (born August 2, 1997) is a Tanzanian actress and model. She was featured in two Swahili language films, Hadithi za Kumekucha: Fatuma (2018) and Bahasha (The Envelope) (2018).

Career
For the 2018 Swahili language Jordan Riber film she was featured in as "Neema" titled, Hadithi za Kumekucha: Fatuma, also starring Beatrice Taisamo and Ayoub Bombwe, she was nominated and awarded a "Best Actress" award in the Swahili Movies special category at the 2018 Zanzibar International Film Festival (ZIFF).

Still in 2018, she again featured in Jordan Riber's Swahili language drama titled, Bahasha, in which she played the role of Hidaya. Other featured stars include Ayoub Bombwe and Godliver Gordian.

In the 15th Africa Movie Academy Awards (AMAA), she was nominated in the "AMAA 2019 Award For Best Young/Promising Actor", for the film, Fatuma, won by Ghana's Cynthia Dankwa.

Filmography

Accolades

References

External links
 Cathryn Credo on IMDb
 Catherin Credo on Multichoice Talent Factory
 Cathryn Credo on Mubi

Living people
1997 births
Tanzanian actresses
Tanzanian models
21st-century Tanzanian actresses